William Marshall (1796 – 16 May 1872) was a British politician.

He served as the Member of Parliament for Petersfield (1826–1830), for Leominster (1830–31), for Beverley (1831–1832), for Carlisle (1835–1847), and for East Cumberland (1847–1868).

He was the eldest son of the wealthy industrialist John Marshall who introduced major innovations in flax spinning and built the celebrated Marshall's Mill and Temple Works in Leeds, West Yorkshire. Their family name may have inspired the character of Richard Marshall in the 1968 film Witchfinder General, which is set in that area during the English Civil War.

His younger brothers John and James Garth were both MPs for Leeds. The fourth brother, Henry Cowper, was Mayor of Leeds in 1842–1843. Marshall's daughter, Elizabeth Margaret, was the mother of the diplomat, Sir Cecil Spring Rice.

References

External links 
 

1796 births
1872 deaths
Liberal Party (UK) MPs for English constituencies
Politicians from Leeds
UK MPs 1826–1830
UK MPs 1830–1831
UK MPs 1831–1832
UK MPs 1835–1837
UK MPs 1837–1841
UK MPs 1841–1847
UK MPs 1847–1852
UK MPs 1852–1857
UK MPs 1857–1859
UK MPs 1859–1865
UK MPs 1865–1868